Stephen Ferrughelli (March 12, 1949 – June 25, 2016) was a Canadian football player who was a fullback in the Canadian Football League.

A graduate of Rutgers University, Ferrughelli had overcome difficult childhood handicaps (speech and hearing impairments) to earn his education and football scholarship. Ferrughelli would have a brief stint in the NFL with the New Orleans Saints and Washington Redskins before a knee injury led to him being cut.  He subsequently moved to the Canadian Football League. He joined Montreal in 1973 but made a huge impact the next season, rushing for 1124 yards, being named an all-star, and winning the Grey Cup. In 1975, he rushed for another 893 yards and was named Grey Cup Most Valuable Player in a one-point loss to the Edmonton Eskimos. Ferrughelli was caught in an import/Canadian ratio tangle in 1976, when Montreal needed a defensive back and were able to acquire a Canadian first stringer from Edmonton in exchange for him. He was traded to Edmonton, where he finished his career. He had played 43 regular season games for the Als (and 5 for the Esks) and had 2763 total rushing yards.

Ferughelli later worked in the home-renovation business in Montreal's West Island. He subsequently moved to Rigaud, where he died on June 25, 2016.

References

1949 births
American players of Canadian football
Edmonton Elks players
Montreal Alouettes players
Players of American football from Newark, New Jersey
Players of Canadian football from Newark, New Jersey
Rutgers Scarlet Knights football players
Rutgers University alumni
2016 deaths